Belfast Bikes, also known for sponsorship reasons as Just Eat Belfast Bikes as is a public bicycle rental scheme which has operated in the city of Belfast since April 2015. At its launch, the scheme, which was then sponsored by Coca-Cola HBC, used 300 Unisex bicycles with 30 stations.

Belfast City Council owns the scheme. The Department for Regional Development (DRD) provided initial capital funding for the scheme as part of their Active Travel Demonstration Projects budget.  NSL is looking after the daily operation of the scheme, while Nextbike is responsible for the bikes.

Expansion and development 
Starting initially with 30 stations, the number has increased to 45, and has expanded beyond the city centre area. This includes two stations at Queen's University Belfast (the cost of which was covered by the University), one close to the Titanic Belfast Convention Centre, and at the Mater, Royal Victoria and Belfast City Hospitals (the cost covered by the Belfast Health and Social Care Trust).  Locations in more residential areas (Shankill Road, Duncairn and the new CS Lewis Square) is also a new feature of the expanding scheme.

Plans for expansion are ratified by vote by Belfast City Council Strategic Policy and Resources Committee.

Sponsorship
At its launch the scheme was sponsored by Coca-Cola HBC for a three-year period and was known as Coca-Cola Zero Belfast Bikes. In April 2018 this sponsorship deal ended and after a tendering process Just Eat were named as the new sponsors in August 2018 with the scheme to be branded as Just Eat Belfast Bikes.

Costs

To use the system, users need to take out a subscription, which allows the subscriber an unlimited number of rentals. Subscribers can get an Annual Hire Card costing £25, or a 3-day ticket costing £6. Users also authorise Belfast Bikes to charge £120 from their credit card if the bike is not returned. The first half-hour of every journey is free, after that a service charge applies. See below for pricing structure:

In response to a Freedom of Information request, Belfast City Council published financial figures relating to subsidies to the scheme. In its first year, the Council subsidised it to the tune of £173,000. From April 2016 to April 2017, this increased to £215,000, despite a Business Case showing subsidies would reduce from £56,440 (April 2015 to April 2016), £23,050 (April 2016 - April 2017) and return a profit of £10,730 (April 2017 - April 2018).

Stations

See here for a map of the current Belfast Bike docking stations.

See also
 List of bicycle sharing systems

References

External links
 Official website
 Belfast City Council site
 Twitter Page

Community bicycle programs
Cycling in Northern Ireland
Transport in Belfast
Bicycle sharing in Northern Ireland